Jason Tanamor (born April 25, 1975) is a Filipino-American author, writer, and entertainment interviewer. He and his books have been featured in many publications such as Library Journal, Publishers Weekly, Yahoo!, Esquire (Philippines), CNN Philippines, Daily Inquirer (Philippines), and Daily Tribune (Philippines). Tanamor also is ranked in the Favorite Filipino and Filipino-American Author poll at Ranker. He was named as one of the "5 Best Modern Filipino Writers" by Pinas magazine.

His novels range in genre, from dark in nature to satirical and from young adult to children's. His novel, a NA urban fantasy about Filipino folklore (aswang) called Vampires of Portlandia, touches upon his love for campy horror stories. "It’s not really a fascination but I do love the genre, but mixed with dark humor or comedy, which includes the shows 'Supernatural' and 'Grimm', and the movies 'The Lost Boys' and 'Beetlejuice'. The new novel is a mashup of these shows and movies." It was recently optioned for screen and is currently in development.

Tanamor's newest effort, a YA titled Love, Dance & Egg Rolls is set in Portland during the Trump Administration and follows high school sophomore, Jamie, whose sole purpose in life is to become the next Tinikling master. (Tinikling is the national dance of the Philippines.) On May 10, 2022, the day it debuted, Powell's Books picked it as a "Pick of the Month."

His two novels, Anonymous and Drama Dolls, have received critical acclaim from major publications such as Publishers Weekly – who called him a "promising writer with lots of potential" and compared him to Chuck Palahniuk and Charles Bukowski – and Audio Book Reviewer.

Biography 
Tanamor is from the Quad-Cities (Iowa/Illinois) and is the middle child of three boys of Filipino parents. Asked how he ended up in Illinois, he quipped that his parents ran out of gas. A few more dollars and he could have been from St. Louis. In regard to the diverse nature of his books, he didn't want to be known for being one-dimensional. The world doesn't need another John Grisham novel – they're all about law.

He is a former contract specialist for the United States Department of Defense.
His former agency, Army Contracting Command at Rock Island Arsenal in Rock Island, IL, was the focal point of the 2016 movie War Dogs. His former team, Field Support Directorate, won the 2016 Secretary of the Army Excellence in Contracting Award for Contingency Contracting. 

In his free time, he has contributed to numerous publications including Yahoo! and Cinema Blend,

Tanamor also has covered President Obama when he spoke at Alcoa Davenport Works as a part of the White House Press Pool.

Prior to working for the United States Department of Defense, Tanamor grew up doing stand-up comedy idolizing Jerry Seinfeld and Jay Leno. He then transitioned into writing. Since then, he's been juggling full-time employment with writing novels. Tanamor does this by maintaining a strict routine. "Once I start writing, I make time in the morning, usually around 3:30–5:00 am. Sometimes throughout the day on weekends, but generally I feel motivated early. I have a certain spot on the couch where I sit with my laptop, one of my cats, and coffee."

Tanamor was married in 2006.

He currently lives and works in the Portland, Oregon area, but still keeps a house in Illinois, which was built for John Shields by Rock Island famed architect, George Stauduhar of the Stauduhar House, and was formerly owned by New York Giants football player, George Franck.

The house is located in the Highland Park Historic District in Rock Island, Illinois.

Journalism

Western Courier 
In December 2001, Tanamor began writing for The Western Courier, the student newspaper at his alma mater, Western Illinois University, in Macomb, Illinois. After one of his first humor/entertainment columns appeared, a Macomb resident wrote in to the editor stating that Tanamor was embarrassing the community by writing babble, instead of contributing columns with insight. The concerned citizen said that Tanamor had an "amateurish level of writing skills." Tanamor continued to write for the paper until December 2002, when he graduated.

Just Laugh 

From December 2001 to September 2003, Tanamor expanded his reach by contributing to the Internet humor magazine, Just Laugh. There, he wrote comedic opinion pieces and fictitious news stories.

Rock Island Argus 

From April 2003 to May 2009, Tanamor contributed regularly to The Rock Island Argus newspaper. At the publication, he covered the comedy beat for the Quad-Cities.

Zoiks! Online 

In August 2004, Tanamor started the entertainment website, Zoiks! Online. The first edition ran for almost 18 months. However, his busy schedule put the website on the back burner. According to the Moline Dispatch, "when he went back to relaunch the site, he found he'd forgotten his password, as well as the answers to the security questions he'd made up, and the site's host, Yahoo! wouldn't reveal them, despite his efforts." Tanamor stated that although losing his password sucked, he could definitely vouch for Yahoo!'s security. Ultimately, Tanamor ended up re-launching the site later in October 2008.

In May 2009, Zoiks! Online teamed up with the comedy website, The Laugh Button. While The Laugh Button was tapped to provide comedy bits via video and audio clips, Zoiks! Online would manage the website side by providing written interviews of comedians that The Laugh Button featured. Tanamor stated that both Zoiks! Online and The Laugh Button shared a passion for stand-up comedy. "When we started talking, we realized that there were a lot of synergies between Zoiks! and TLB. It was no-brainer to work together."

On December 31, 2016, Tanamor resigned  as editor of Zoiks! Online.

Novels 

Tanamor stated, in regard to his readership for his dark novels, that his books are for those who relate to unusual characters and plots, such as those found in Chuck Palahniuk, Gillian Flynn, and Charles Bukowski books. Also, that he is inspired by people who are "messed up," saying that these types of individuals make his life feel normal. "I wanted to write a book with stories that people like to hear, but don't necessarily like to tell". Since then, he's gone onto write lighter works.

Love, Dance & Egg Rolls 

The YA rom-com novel, Love, Dance & Egg Rolls, is loosely based on Tanamor’s time dancing Filipino folk dances... The novel tackles a topic that people of color go through regularly—cultural identity... “I wanted to write a story about my experience because growing up, I didn’t see characters that looked like me,” he said. “Most of the stories in the past that I’ve written were either white or faceless because I didn’t think that people of color deserved to be main characters. It was something that media and society had conditioned me growing up.” Booklist reviewed the book and, in regards to the seriousness of the topic, said,"...Tanamor balances the serious subject matter with keen humor... making this book both impactful and fun."

Vampires of Portlandia 

The new adult/urban fantasy novel, Vampires of Portlandia, is about a family of Filipino vampires that immigrates to the weird city of Portland, Oregon, only to discover that there are other breeds of monsters living amongst them. The novel will appeal to fans of The Twilight Saga and the television show, Grimm. The book will be published by Parliament House Press, a SFF publisher. Tanamor said about the novel, "I’d always wanted to write about Filipino lore (my parents are from the Philippines), and when I moved to Portland, I discovered this entirely different world downtown. It all made sense to have the family relocate. In an interview with GoodNews Pilipinas, regarding the characters, Tanamor said, "The main characters are homogenized versions of various Filipinos I know, either friends of the family or relatives. I’d based the young twin, Geena, off my niece when she was the same age as the character. Overall, I think that each character has a little bit of me in them. But, mostly Filipinos have similar traits – they point with their lips, and are always offering you food." Regarding the folklore and staying true, Tanamor told Sci-Fi and Scary, "The thing with aswang folklore is that there aren’t a lot of “standards” outside their physical traits. There are so many different interpretations, different ways to become an aswang, or kill them, unlike what we see in Hollywood renditions. My hope is to introduce the folklore to the mainstream and encourage other stories about Filipino folklore and culture. Whether or not they stick to the lore." Asian Journal listed the book as a "Fil-Am book to read during Summer 2020." And bestselling author, John Shirley, said the novel "rocks Filipino folklore, shape shifters, vampires, and quick moving, tricksy, balls-out adventure, and it's a helluva lot of fun." Publishers Weekly wrote "...creative worldbuilding of Portland’s supernatural underworld...the most devoted vampire enthusiasts will find this rewarding." And Library Journal said about the book: "Those who enjoy the “Twilight” books or TV series “Grimm” may find this entertaining. Portland enthusiasts will also appreciate the references."

Drama Dolls 

The dark humor/psychological thriller, Drama Dolls, was born after Tanamor watched a documentary about grown men dressing up as dolls and going out in public. Tanamor said, "During the interview, it was clear that in their minds they thought everyone was staring at them because they were beautiful, but then the juxtaposition was the majority of people who were going, 'What is that?'"

He thought about why men would act out in this manner, chocking up that a death of a spouse may trigger this behavior. This kicked his thought process into gear and the result was a story about a man who grieves his wife unnaturally by dressing as cheerleaders with his friends.

Anonymous 

The literary/horror novel, Anonymous, was the result of an online course facilitated by Palahniuk, where students had to write a short story based on writing lessons and the Fight Club (novel) author would offer feedback at the end of each lesson. Tanamor stated that each short story shared a common theme and eventually became the novel. One such story involves a man who impersonated Britney Spears' manager in order to embezzle money from restaurants.

The novel received a Star Review from Publishers Weekly.

The Extraordinary Life of Shady Gray 

For his young adult novel, The Extraordinary Life of Shady Gray, Tanamor referred to it as his "Oprah" story, stating that the novel will encourage readers to appreciate their own families. Referring to this book as a fictional biography, whereas many of the past events in his real life are played out through the main protagonist's life, he went on to state how personal the events were in his childhood, which made writing the novel a challenge.

"When I was trying to engage myself as young Jason Tanamor it was often difficult to get back in that frame of mind or recall specific emotions that surrounded that experience." He stated that the bulk of this novel was written during the DoD Furlough which resulted in United States budget sequestration in 2013.

Hello Fabulous! 

The satirical novella, Hello Fabulous!, is loosely based on a real life story involving Tanamor and his doppelganger. The author was continually getting confused with his twin by random people – mostly women – and even his twin's own mother. The long drawn out process resulted in the novella about a straight, boring man who was continuously being mixed up for a gay, fabulous man. Tanamor stated that writing out the story was therapeutic. The two eventually met in real life.

I Heart Superhero Kid 

The children's superhero themed book was illustrated by Tanamor's son. The story revolves around a battle between Superhero Kid and Evil Man, written in rhyming verse. According to a Rock Island Argus story, Tanamor said that the book surrounds a hero, his arch-enemy, talking cats, and a girl with a crush. "People are fascinated with superheroes. Me included. Since I was a child, there was this secret obsession with having super powers," Tanamor said.

In regard to the book's audience, Tanamor stated, "I love superhero stories that have real world implications... When people can relate to the storyline, it gives readers hope that they can conquer their own complex situations or battles."

Tanamor stated that the inspiration behind the children's superhero book came from his work with the United States Department of the Army.

Moo Moo the Serial Killer Cat 

Tanamor's cat, Moo Moo, has brought in many animals for his parents to enjoy. After the cat brought in a headless bunny, Tanamor started sharing the kills on social media. "Part of the reason I started posting them was mainly to document our life in case he was practicing his craft," he said.

"If Moo Moo decided to kill my wife and me, I at least wanted Facebook to know where to look first. When people say, 'It's always the boyfriend,' in this case, 'It's definitely the cat.'"

When the posts became popular, Tanamor put them together and wrote a rhyming story around it.

All the proceeds of the book go to the local shelter where Tanamor adopted Moo Moo. "I know how much help the shelters need," he said. "I figure this would be a good way to donate to an important cause and make it fun." Each book comes "paw-tographed" by Moo Moo.

Awards and recognition 

 Ranked in the "Favorite Filipino and Filipino-American Author" list on Ranker
 Named one of the "5 Best Modern Filipino Writers" by Pinas
 Listed in Positively Filipino's "Fil-Ams Among the Remarkable and Famous" list.

References

External links 

 Jason Tanamor's Official Website

American male novelists
Living people
1975 births
Place of birth missing (living people)
Novelists from Illinois
21st-century American novelists
21st-century American male writers
Filipino novelists
Filipino male writers
Writers from Portland, Oregon
Novelists from Oregon
American writers of Filipino descent
Filipino writers
21st-century Filipino writers